Edøy is a former municipality in Møre og Romsdal county, Norway. The municipality existed from 1838 until its dissolution in 1960. It was located in the southern and central parts of the present-day Smøla Municipality. The old municipality originally encompassed all the islands surrounding the Edøyfjorden. This included the islands of Smøla, Tustna, Stabblandet, and the many smaller islands between the larger ones. The island of Edøya lies between the two and that was the center of the old municipality. Over time, parts of Edøy were split off to form other municipalities. The Old Edøy Church and later the (new) Edøy Church were the main churches for the municipality.

History
The parish of Edø (later spelled Edøy) was established as a municipality on 1 January 1838 (see formannskapsdistrikt). A royal resolution of 3 May 1873 directed that the southern Tustern parish be removed from Edøy to create the new municipality of Tustern effective on 1 January 1874. This left Edøy with 2,166 inhabitants. On 1 January 1915, the municipality was divided into three.  The northeastern district (population: 1,050) was separated to become Hopen Municipality and the northwestern area (population: 1,462) became the new Brattvær Municipality. This split left Edøy with a population of 973.  During the 1960s, there were many municipal mergers across Norway due to the work of the Schei Committee. On 1 January 1960, the 1915 partition was reversed, reuniting the municipalities Brattvær, Edøy, and Hopen as the new municipality of Smøla. Prior to the merger, Edøy had a population of 1,135.

In 2019, archaeologists from the Norwegian Institute for Cultural Heritage Research using large-scale high-resolution georadar technology, determined that a 17 meter long Viking ship was buried near the Edøy Church. Traces of a small settlement were also found. They estimate the ship's age as over 1,000 years: from the Merovingian or Viking period. The group planned to conduct additional searches in the area. A similar burial was found previously by NIKU archaeologists in 2018, in Gjellestad.

Government
All municipalities in Norway, including Edøy, are responsible for primary education (through 10th grade), outpatient health services, senior citizen services, unemployment and other social services, zoning, economic development, and municipal roads.  The municipality is governed by a municipal council of elected representatives, which in turn elects a mayor.

Municipal council
The municipal council  of Edøy was made up of 17 representatives that were elected to four year terms.  The party breakdown of the final municipal council was as follows:

See also
List of former municipalities of Norway

References

Smøla
Former municipalities of Norway
1838 establishments in Norway
1960 disestablishments in Norway